The R681 road is a regional road in County Waterford, Ireland. It travels from the R680 road to the R675, from the village of Kilmeaden to Knockmahon, via Kill.

References

Regional roads in the Republic of Ireland
Roads in County Waterford